The first Cherokee Female Seminary was a boarding school opened by the Cherokee Nation in 1851 in Park Hill, Oklahoma. On Easter Sunday 1887, a fire burned the building, but the head of the school, Florence Wilson, made sure all the girls got out. Two years later, in 1889, the new Cherokee Female Seminary reopened and still stands just north of Tahlequah.

Today the Cherokee Heritage Center stands on the grounds of the original Cherokee Female Seminary. The only Classical Revival architecture features to survive the 1887 fire, the school's columns still stand today and are surrounded by roses.

See also
Cherokee Male Seminary

References

External links

Northeastern State University
School buildings on the National Register of Historic Places in Oklahoma
Education in Cherokee County, Oklahoma
Cherokee Nation (1794–1907)
Tribal colleges and universities
Female seminaries in the United States
Neoclassical architecture in Oklahoma
Historic American Buildings Survey in Oklahoma
National Register of Historic Places in Cherokee County, Oklahoma